Aleksandr Nikulin may refer to:

  (1918–1998), Soviet and Russian pilot, and Hero of the Russian Federation
 Aleksandr Nikulin (footballer, born 1979), Russian footballer
 Aleksandr Yevgenyevich Nikulin (born 1985), Russian footballer
 Alexander Nikulin (ice hockey) (born 1985), Russian hockey player
 Aleksandr Nikulin (judge), Donesk Republic judge